The Society of Antiquaries of London (SAL) is a learned society "charged by its Royal Charter of 1751 with 'the encouragement, advancement and furtherance of the study and knowledge of the antiquities and history of this and other countries'." It is based at Burlington House, Piccadilly, London (a building owned by the UK government), and is a registered charity.

Membership

Full members of the society are known as fellows and are entitled to use the post-nominal letters FSA after their names. Fellows are elected by existing members of the society, and to be elected must be "excelling in the knowledge of the antiquities and history of this and other nations" and "desirous to promote the honour, business and emoluments of the Society".

The society retains a highly selective election procedure, in comparison with many other learned societies. Nominations for fellowship can come only from existing fellows of the society, and must be signed by at least five and up to twelve existing fellows, certifying that, from their personal knowledge, the candidate would make a worthy fellow. Elections then occur by anonymous ballot, and to be successful a candidate must achieve a ratio of two "yes" votes for every "no" vote cast by fellows participating in the ballot.

Fellowship is thus regarded as recognition of significant achievement in the fields of archaeology, antiquities, history and heritage.

, the society has a membership of around 3,300 fellows.

In June 2022, the society introduced a lower tier of "affiliate membership", open to anyone on payment of an annual subscription. Benefits include access to and borrowing rights from the society's library.

History and antecedents
A precursor organisation, the College of Antiquaries, was founded  and functioned largely as a debating society until it was forbidden to do so by King James I in 1614.

The first informal meeting of the modern Society of Antiquaries occurred at the Bear Tavern on The Strand on 5 December 1707. This early group, conceived by John Talman, John Bagford, and Humfrey Wanley, sought a charter from Queen Anne for the study of British antiquities; its projected ventures included a series of 35 books to be issued. The proposal for the society was to be advanced by Robert Harley, 1st Earl of Oxford, but his dismissal from government caused it to become idle. The formalisation of proceedings occurred in 1717, and the first minutes at the Mitre Tavern, Fleet Street, are dated 1 January 1718. The first secretary of the revived society was William Stukeley.

Those attending these early meetings examined objects, gave talks, and discussed theories of historical sites. Reports on the dilapidation of significant buildings were also produced. The society was also concerned with the topics of heraldry, genealogy, and historical documents. In 1751, a successful application for a charter of incorporation was sought by its long-serving vice president Joseph Ayloffe, which allowed the society to own property.

The society began to gather large collections of manuscripts, paintings, and artefacts, housing such gifts and bequests while a proper institution for them did not exist. The acquisition of a large group of important paintings in 1828 preceded the establishment of the National Portrait Gallery by some 30 years. A gift of Thomas Kerrich, which included portraits of Edward IV, Mary Tudor, and two of Richard III, reveal anti-Tudor bias in their later portrayal.

Following the London Blitz, the society organised many of the excavations of Roman and medieval ruins exposed by the bombing of the City, with annual surveys performed every year between 1946 and 1962. Among other finds, they discovered the previously unknown London citadel in the northwest corner of the London Wall. The findings were summarized in 1968 by W. F. Grimes.

In 2007, the society celebrated its tercentennial year (recognising the first, less formal meetings) with an exhibition at the Royal Academy entitled Making History: Antiquaries in Britain 1707–2007. The tercentenary was also marked by two substantial publications: a collection of seventeen scholarly essays on the parallel themes of the history of the society itself and changing interpretations of the material relics of the past over the three centuries of its existence; and the illustrated catalogue of the exhibition, which included fifteen shorter thematic essays by various expert contributors.

Library

The society's library is the major archaeological research library in the UK. Having acquired material since the early 18th century, the Library's present holdings number more than 100,000 books and around 800 currently received periodical titles. The catalogue include rare drawings and manuscripts, such as the inventory of all Henry VIII's possessions at the time of his death.

As the oldest archaeological library in the country, the Library holds an outstanding collection of British county histories, a fine collection of 18th- and 19th-century books on the antiquities of Britain and other countries and an exceptionally wide-ranging collection of periodical titles (British and foreign) with runs dating back to the early to mid-19th century.

Publications

Vetusta Monumenta
 
In 1718, the society began to publish a series of illustrated papers on ancient buildings, sites, and artefacts, mainly those of Britain and usually written by members of the society, under the title Vetusta Monumenta. The series continued to appear on an irregular basis until 1906. The papers were published in a folio format, and were notable for the inclusion of finely engraved views and reproductions of artefacts.

An engraver was employed by the society from its inception – the earliest were George Vertue, James Basire and successors – labouring to produce the copperplate used in the printing of the folio editions. The prints were often large and appealing, and were intended to satisfy popular demand for archæological subject matter; their quasi-scientific illustrations were often inset with multiple viewpoints of architectural details. A fellow of the society, Richard Gough (director 1771 to 1791), sought to expand and improve publication of the society's research, motivated by the steady dilapidation of examples of Gothic architecture.

A later series of oversize issues was used to accommodate the format of some historical works, which the society had commissioned to be reproduced by Edward Edwards and Samuel Hieronymus Grimm in water-colour in 1771; the first issues of these were mostly done by Basire. The first of these with a reproduction of a 16th-century oil painting of the historic scene at the Field of the Cloth of Gold. The paper for this series required a larger size than was available, the manufacturer James Whatman was instructed to create a sheet ; the name given to this format is "Antiquarian". The standard printing for this series was 400 prints; the plates were carefully stored by the society and used occasionally to fulfil later requests; only three of the seven plates still exist.

Archaeologia
The society's first journal was Archaeologia (full title: Archaeologia; or, Miscellaneous Tracts relating to Antiquity), of which the first volume appeared, in a quarto format, in 1770. The journal mainly contained papers that had been delivered at the society's meetings: in the early years these included many delivered in previous decades that had remained unpublished. Archaeologia continued to appear on a more or less regular basis until after the Second World War, but then became increasingly irregular, some of its ground having been taken by the society's other journals. Only two volumes were published in the 1980s (vols 107 and 108), and two in the 1990s (vols 109 and 110, published in 1991 and 1992 respectively). The society's tercentennial collection of essays of 2007 was technically published as vol. 111 of Archaeologia. No print volumes have been published since.

In January 2023, Archaeologia was relaunched as an occasional digital journal, to serve as a vehicle for open access research papers of a length falling above the upper limit of 10,000 words for the Antiquaries Journal.

Proceedings and Antiquaries Journal
In 1843 the society took the decision to publish some of its proceedings in a second periodical in a smaller format, initially unillustrated, which could appear on a more frequent basis than Archaeologia: it was entitled Proceedings of the Society of Antiquaries of London. The first part appeared in 1844 (containing papers delivered in 1843), and this first series continued until 1859, by which time four volumes had appeared. A second series was then begun, in which 32 volumes appeared down to 1920.

In 1921 Proceedings was superseded by a new annual journal, the Antiquaries Journal. This continues to the present day, volume 101 having been published in 2021.

Salon
Since the end of 2001, the society has published a fortnightly online newsletter called Salon (Society of Antiquaries Online Newsletter).

Controversy
The society faced controversy in 2019, when its council was unable to pass a resolution to eject fellow Hubert Chesshyre. In 2015, a trial of the facts had reached the verdict that Chesshyre had committed child sexual abuse offences, leading to a recommendation from the Honours Committee that he be stripped of honours. The council issued a statement saying that it "regrets that a majority of those present [at the vote] did not see fit to support the resolution" and that the incident showed "need to modernise the society’s statutes and governance procedures".

In 2020, following comments made by David Starkey on slavery and genocide, the society announced that they were modernising their procedures for dealing with behaviour which runs contrary to their values. Starkey subsequently resigned his fellowship.

Officers

Presidents
The following have served as Presidents of the Society:

See also

 Frend Medal
 Kelmscott Manor
 List of antiquarian societies

References

Further reading

External links

 
 Making History: 300 years of antiquaries in Britain
 Proceedings of the Society of Antiquaries of London (HathiTrust)

 
1717 establishments in England
Archaeological organizations
Archaeological professional associations
Charities based in London
Learned societies of the United Kingdom
Organisations based in London with royal patronage
Organisations based in the City of Westminster